Gabriel Cristian Vașvari (born 13 November 1986) is a Romanian footballer who plays as a midfielder for Politehnica Iași.

Club career
He made his debut on the professional league level in the Liga I for Botoșani on 21 July 2013 as a starter in a game against CFR Cluj. On 8 August 2013, Vașvari scored his first Liga I goal in a 2–1 win over FC Brașov.

Career statistics

Club

Honours

Club 
FC Zalău
Divizia D – Sălaj County: 2005–06, 2006–07

Botoșani
Liga II: 2012–13

Sepsi OSK 
Cupa României: 2021–22

References

External links
 
 

Living people
1986 births
People from Zalău
Romanian footballers
Association football midfielders
Liga I players
Liga II players
FC Zalău players
FC Universitatea Cluj players
FC Botoșani players
ACS Poli Timișoara players
Sepsi OSK Sfântu Gheorghe players
FC Politehnica Iași (2010) players